Brodhead High School is a high school located in Brodhead, Wisconsin, United States. It serves students from the Brodhead community.

Athletics
Brodhead is a member of the Rock Valley Conference.

Its athletics teams are known as the Cardinals, and its mascot is a cardinal named Charlie.

Football 
Brodhead combines with the Juda School District for football and wrestling.  The Cardinals have earned eight Rock Valley Conference championships, 25 consecutive playoff appearances, three state semi-final appearances and two state runner-ups.

Volleyball
The Lady Cardinals have won six conference championships and have made one appearance at the state tournament.

Softball 
 2004 state champions

Track 
 Two men's state championships

Music programs 
The Brodhead band performs at the home football, basketball, and volleyball games. They perform a series of concerts throughout the year.

Brodhead also fields two competitive show choirs, an all-woman group named BHS Express, and a mixed group named Guys and Dolls. Both choirs compete around southeast Wisconsin every winter.

Controversy
Brodhead High School was involved in controversy in late October 2016 over a safety drill on driving. The school made a public morning announcement that four students had died that morning in a car crash. Those students, who were alive, were not allowed to use their cell phones to inform fellow students that it was part of a drill. Later, the school made a second announcement that the students were alive and that this had been a simulation drill. Additional announcements were made during the day about more students dying in crashes that did not actually happen.

Notable alumni 
Jim Meyer, former offensive tackle for the Cleveland Browns and the Green Bay Packers

References

External links
 Home page

Public high schools in Wisconsin
Schools in Green County, Wisconsin